Turkish Odyssey, A Cultural Guide to Turkey is a guidebook written by Şerif Yenen, it is the “first guidebook of Turkey ever written by a Turk”. The book was first published in English in September 1998, the version with a CD-ROM was in 2001, the fourth edition was in 2007. It is translated into Italian, Turkish and German. It is used as textbook and is on suggested reading lists at various universities.

Versions 
Turkish Odyssey, A Cultural Guide to Turkey (English), 
Turkish Odyssey CD-ROM, 
Turkish Odyssey, A Cultural Guide to Turkey with CD-ROM (English), 
Anadolu Destanı, Türkiye Gezi Rehberi (Turkish), 
In Turchia, Un Viaggio nella Cultura Anatolica (Italian), 
Die Türkische Odyssee, Ein Kulturreiseführer für die Türkei (German),

References 

1998 non-fiction books
Travel guide books
Turkish travel books